Copăcele is a commune in Caraș-Severin County, western Romania with a population of 1,087 people. It is composed of four villages: Copăcele, Ohaba-Mâtnic, Ruginosu and Zorile. At the 2011 census,  61.1% of inhabitants were Ukrainians and 38.4% Romanians. Copăcele is situated in the historical region of Banat.

References

Communes in Caraș-Severin County
Localities in Romanian Banat
Ukrainian communities in Romania